Dipayal Silgadhi is a municipality and the district headquarters of Doti District in Sudurpashchim Province of Nepal. Previously, it also served as the headquarters of the Far-Western Development Region. It lies in the Lesser Himalayas on the bank of Seti River. At the time of the 2011 Nepal census it had a population of 32,941 people living in 7,447 individual households.

Demographics
At the time of the 2011 Nepal census, Dipayal Silgadhi Municipality had a population of 36,038. Of these, 85.8% spoke Doteli, 12.2% Nepali, 0.4% Maithili, 0.4% Tharu, 0.2% Hindi, 0.2% Magar, 0.2% Baitadeli, 0.1% Newar, 0.1% Urdu and 0.2% other languages as their first language.

In terms of ethnicity/caste, 61.9% were Chhetri, 9.9% Kami, 6.5% Damai/Dholi, 5.2% Hill Brahmin, 3.3% other Dalit, 2.3% Lohar, 2.2% Newar, 1.9% Thakuri, 1.7% Badi, 1.4% Sarki, 0.6% Magar, 0.5% Tharu, 0.4% Kumal, 0.4% Majhi, 0.3% Gurung, 0.2% Sanyasi/Dasnami, 0.2% Musalman, 0.1% other Terai, 0.1% Rai, 0.1% Tamang, 0.1% Hajam/Thakur, 0.1% Bengali, 0.1% Halwai and 0.2% others.

In terms of religion, 99.3% were Hindu, 0.4% Christian, 0.2% Muslim and 0.1% Buddhist.

Transportation  
Seti Highway begins in Dipayal Silgadhi, linking it to Amargadhi, from where the Terai region of Nepal can be reached on Mahakali Highway.

Doti Airport is now functional operating twice a week lies in Dipayal Silgadhi.

Media
Radio Nepal has a regional station in Dipayal Silgadhi which transmits various programs of mass interest.
Silgadhi based Tribeni FM 94.4 MHz, Radio Shaileswori 105.9 MHz are the F.M. station here to serve people. Among them  Tribeni FM and  Radio Shaileswori are Community radio Station.

References

External links

UN map of the municipalities of Doti District

Populated places in Doti District
Tourism in Nepal
Municipalities in Doti District
Nepal municipalities established in 1982